Ricardo Hocevar (born 5 May 1985) is a former Brazilian professional tennis player.

ATP Challenger finals

Singles: 3 (1–2)

Doubles: 9 (1–8)

References

External links
 
 

Brazilian male tennis players
Tennis players from São Paulo
1985 births
Living people